Spiomenia is a genus of solenogaster, shell-less, worm-like, marine  mollusks.

Species
 Spiomenia phaseolosa Todt & Salvini-Plawen, 2003
 Spiomenia praematura Todt & Salvini-Plawen, 2003
 Spiomenia pusilla Gil-Mansilla, García-Álvarez & Urgorri, 2009
 Spiomenia spiculata Arnofsky, 2000

References

External links
 Arnofsky P. (2000). Spiomenia spiculata, gen. et sp. nov (Aplacophora: Neomeniomorpha) collected from the deep waters of the West European Basin. The Veliger 43(2): 110-119
 Cobo, M. C.; Kocot, K. M. (2020). Micromenia amphiatlantica sp. nov.: First solenogaster (Mollusca, Aplacophora) with an amphi-Atlantic distribution and insight into abyssal solenogaster diversity. Deep Sea Research Part I: Oceanographic Research Papers. 157: 103189
 Check List of European Marine Mollusca

Solenogastres